Charles Henkel Jr. (1895–1959) was an American film editor. He was prolifically active during the 1930s and early 1940s, editing around seventy films at a variety of lower-budget studios including Grand National, Monogram Pictures and Producers Releasing Corporation.

Selected filmography

 The Lone Bandit (1935)
 The Outlaw Tamer (1935)
 Too Much Beef (1936)
 Men of the Plains (1936)
 I'll Name the Murderer (1936)
 Rip Roarin' Buckaroo (1936)
 Idaho Kid (1936)
 Law and Lead (1936)
 Two Minutes to Play (1936)
 Stormy Trails (1936)
 The Phantom of the Range (1936)
 West of Nevada (1936)
 The Reckless Way (1936)
 Special Agent K-7 (1937)
 The Shadow Strikes (1937)
 Cheyenne Rides Again (1937)
 International Crime (1938)
 Whirlwind Horseman (1938)
 Six-Shootin' Sheriff (1938)
 In Old Montana (1939)
 Lure of the Wasteland (1939)
 Code of the Fearless (1939)
 Two Gun Troubador (1939)
 Ridin' the Trail (1940)
 Lightning Strikes West (1940)
 City of Missing Girls (1941)
 Swamp Woman (1941)
 I'll Sell My Life (1941)
 Hard Guy (1941)
 Lady from Chungking (1942)
 Bombs Over Burma (1942)
 The Rangers Take Over (1942)
 The Payoff (1942)
 Today I Hang (1942)
 The Boss of Big Town (1942)
 They Raid by Night (1942)
 Secrets of a Co-Ed (1942)
 Girls in Chains (1943)
 The Return of the Rangers (1943)
 The Underdog (1943)
 Trail of Terror (1943)
 West of Texas (1943)
 Fighting Valley (1943)
 Isle of Forgotten Sins (1943)
 Boss of Rawhide (1943)
 The Ghost and the Guest (1943)
 Corregidor (1943)
 Border Buckaroos (1943)
 Bad Men of Thunder Gap (1943)
 Spook Town (1944)
 Brand of the Devil (1944)
 Outlaw Roundup (1944)
 Gangsters of the Frontier (1944)
 Men on Her Mind (1944)
 The Pinto Bandit (1944)
 Gunsmoke Mesa (1944)
 Guns of the Law (1944)
 I Accuse My Parents (1944)
 Waterfront (1944)
 Seven Doors to Death (1944)
 Brenda Starr, Reporter (1945)
 Wildfire (1945)

References

Bibliography
 Pitts, Michael R. Poverty Row Studios, 1929-1940. McFarland & Company, 2005.

External links

1895 births
1959 deaths
People from New York City
American film editors